Edmund John Giblin (29 June 1923 – 28 January 2000) was an English footballer who played in the Football League for Stoke City.

Career
Foster played for Tunstall Boys' Club before joining Stoke during World War II. He made one appearance for Stoke in the Football League which came in a 2–0 defeat at home to Manchester United in February 1948. Afterwards he left the club for non-league Stafford Rangers.

Career statistics

References

English footballers
Stoke City F.C. players
Stafford Rangers F.C. players
English Football League players
1923 births
2000 deaths
Association football wing halves